Maggie Simpson in "Playdate with Destiny" is a 2020 American animated short film based on the animated television series The Simpsons. The film features Maggie Simpson. It is the first Simpsons short film released after the Disney acquisition of 20th Century Studios (formerly 20th Century Fox).

The film premiered on February 29, 2020, attached to advance screenings of the Disney/Pixar release Onward, with its general rollout on March 6, 2020. It is the third Simpsons film made for theatrical release, after The Simpsons Movie (2007) and The Longest Daycare (2012). The short was released on April 10, 2020 on Disney+.

Plot 
Maggie Simpson is taken to a playground by Marge. When another baby goes down the slide and almost crashes into her, she is saved by a boy named Hudson. Maggie becomes smitten with Hudson, and that's when the two play games together, which Maggie fantasizes as a whirlwind romance. At the end of the day, Maggie gives Hudson her blue bow to remember her by, and that night, she dreams about Hudson in her sleep.

The next day, Homer looks after Maggie instead of Marge, and decides he takes her to a different park with food trucks. Maggie sees Hudson waiting for her in the adjacent park, and desperately tries to get his attention, but fails when Homer pulls her away before she can. That night, Maggie drowns her sorrows in baby formula and becomes despondent over not being able to see Hudson.

The next day, Homer babysits Maggie again. Before he can take her to the same park as the day before, Maggie grabs hold of the car's steering wheel and steers it into the park where she met Hudson. She sees him boarding a train for children and runs across the park to catch up with him.

When Hudson sees Maggie trying to catch up with the train, he reaches out to her with her blue bow, but as she grabs her bow, Maggie fails to catch up before the train pulls away out of her reach. Maggie believes Hudson is gone forever, but is unaware that the train (running on a circular closed track) loops around to the station at which it started. Maggie and Hudson reunite on the train engine's cowcatcher, and exchange pacifiers (in lieu of sharing a kiss).

Production
Playdate with Destinys plot was pitched by The Simpsons writers Tom Gammill and Max Pross as part of the episode of season 31, "The Incredible Lightness of Being a Baby." They began working on the episode, and executive producer Jim Brooks suggested using the plot for a short instead.

After 21st Century Fox's purchase by Disney, the Simpsons staff sent Playdate with Destiny to Bob Iger and the Disney staff. According to Al Jean, they asked "Can we please, please go in front of a Pixar movie?" Once approved, they requested to be shown with "something that's compatible"; the staff were "ecstatic" when offered Onward.

Disney's acquisition of 20th Century Studios is reflected in the short's introduction showing a silhouette of Mickey Mouse before transitioning to Homer Simpson holding two donuts. Likewise, the logo for Gracie Films seen at the end of the short replaces one of the patrons with Mickey Mouse.

Release 
Playdate with Destiny was first announced to the public on the show's official Instagram on February 27, 2020. It was revealed that the short would be shown in theaters in the United States prior to screenings of the film Onward, starting on March 6, 2020.

It was released to the streaming service Disney+ on April 10, 2020.

Followups
The Simpsons episode "The Incredible Lightness of Being a Baby" has been described as "an extension" and "a sequel," featuring a reappearance of Hudson.

A further short film featuring Maggie Simpson titled The Force Awakens from Its Nap released on Disney+ on May 4, 2021, Star Wars Day. It is the first of a series of shorts of The Simpsons, crossing over with other franchises on Disney+, throughout 2021.

Notes

References

External links 
 

2020 short films
2020 3D films
American 3D films
American comedy short films
American animated short films
2020s English-language films
2020 animated films
Films based on television series
Animated films based on animated series
Films set in the United States
20th Century Studios animated films
Film spin-offs
The Simpsons short films
Disney+ original films
20th Century Animation films
Gracie Films films
2020s American animated films
20th Century Studios short films
3D animated short films
2020s animated short films
Films directed by David Silverman
Films produced by James L. Brooks
Films produced by Matt Groening
Films scored by James Dooley
Films with screenplays by James L. Brooks
Films with screenplays by Matt Groening
2020s Disney animated short films